The Constitution of Malawi is the basic law governing Malawi. It was adopted on May 16, 1994.

External links
Constitution of Malawi

Malawi
Politics of Malawi